Samuel (L) Bruce Richards was the first Dean of Trinidad.
He worked at Saint Philip, Barbados before coming to Trinidad where he set up a school for the children of church goers.

References

1955 births
Deans of Trinidad
Living people